Protein phosphatase 2A may refer to:
 Protein phosphatase 2, an enzyme
 (myosin-light-chain) phosphatase, an enzyme